Lloyd George Wasserbach (January 30, 1921 – February 1, 1949) was a player in the All-America Football Conference for the Chicago Rockets in 1946 and 1947 as a tackle. He played at the collegiate level at the University of Wisconsin–Madison.  He was drafted in the 1943 NFL Draft by the Green Bay Packers, but was drafted into World War II before he had a chance to play for the team.

Biography
Wasserbach was born Lloyd George Wasserbach on January 30, 1921, in Baileys Harbor, Wisconsin. He died on February 1, 1949, in a hotel fire in Ripon, Wisconsin.

References

1921 births
1949 deaths
People from Baileys Harbor, Wisconsin
Players of American football from Wisconsin
American football offensive tackles
Wisconsin Badgers football players
Chicago Rockets players
Deaths from fire in the United States
American military personnel of World War II